Deborah Cameron may refer to:
 Deborah Cameron (radio presenter) (1958–2018), Australian journalist and radio presenter
 Deborah Cameron (linguist) (born 1958), Oxford university professor and author
 Debbie Cameron (born 1958), American-Danish singer